Petr Tlustý (born 17 January 1986) is a Czech footballer defender, who currently plays for FC Vysočina Jihlava.

References

External links
 

1986 births
Living people
Czech footballers
Czech First League players
FC Vysočina Jihlava players

Association football defenders